Guillenia is a small genus of mustard plants containing three species. These are sometimes treated as members of the jewelflower genus Caulanthus. They are native to western North America.

Species:
Guillenia flavescens - yellow mustard
Guillenia lasiophylla - California mustard
Guillenia lemmonii - Lemmon's mustard

References

External links 
 Jepson Manual Treatment
 USDA Plants Profile
 

Brassicaceae
Brassicaceae genera